Fell Historic District is a national historic district located at Wilmington, New Castle County, Delaware. It encompasses eight contributing buildings in a steeply sloped area along Red Clay Creek. The area developed in the 19th century as a wealthy gentleman's country manufacturing/farming estate. It includes the stuccoed fieldstone, Greek Revival style Fell Mansion (c. 1835); a Romanesque Revival stone carriage house (1893); a Carpenter Gothic frame gatehouse (c. 1860); two frame tenant houses (c. 1860), one of which was built in a "Swiss Chalet" style; a stone barn and a stuccoed stone miller's residence (c. 1800); and a stone Georgian Revival dwelling dating from 1925.

It was added to the National Register of Historic Places in 1983.

References

Greek Revival houses in Delaware
Romanesque Revival architecture in Delaware
Georgian Revival architecture in Delaware
Historic districts in Wilmington, Delaware
Historic districts on the National Register of Historic Places in Delaware
National Register of Historic Places in Wilmington, Delaware